Jōdo-ji may refer to:

 Jōdo-ji (Matsuyama), a Buddhist temple in Matsuyama, Ehime Prefecture, Japan
 Jōdo-ji (Ono), a Buddhist temple in Ono, Hyōgo Prefecture, Japan
 Jōdo-ji (Onomichi), a Buddhist temple in Onomichi, Hiroshima Prefecture, Japan